The Central District of Ajab Shir County is in East Azerbaijan province, Iran. At the 2006 census, its population was 47,017 in 11,835 households. The following census in 2011 counted 49,967 people in 13,548 households. At the latest census in 2016, the district had 53,845 inhabitants living in 15,540 households.

References 

Ajab Shir County

Districts of East Azerbaijan Province

Populated places in East Azerbaijan Province

Populated places in Ajab Shir County